Dieter Medicus (9 May 1929 – 6 June 2015) was a German jurist. Until his retirement in 1994 he was professor of Private Law and history of Ancient law at the University of Munich.

Life 
Medicus was born 1929 in Berlin. His father was a chemist. He studied law at the Humboldt University Berlin, University of Würzburg and University of Münster. In 1954 he passed the first state exam (erstes juristisches Staatsexamen) and in 1957 the second state exam (zweites Staatsexamen)) in Münster. He was a doctoral student of Max Kaser (dissertation Zur Geschichte des Senatus consultum Velleianum—‘On the History of the Senatus Consultum Velleianium’ in 1956) and habilitated in 1962 (Id quod interest. Studien zum römischen Recht des Schadensersatzes—‘Id quod interest. Studies about the Roman law of damages’). In 1962 he was full professor at the University of Kiel, afterwards at the University of Tübingen (1966) and Regensburg (1969). From 1978 to 1994 was full professor of Private Law and history of Ancient law at the University of Munich.

Medicus is author of the standard text book on German private Law (Bürgerliches Recht, 23rd edition 2011). Bürgerliches Recht was translated into Japanese (Doitsu-minpō, 1997) and hailed as “beacon of scholarly writing”. It is “well-known to every German lawyer” and even cited by courts. His book on the General Part of the German Civil Code (Allgemeiner Teil des Bürgerlichen Rechts) was translated into Chinese (De guo min fa zong lun, 2000). His text books on the law of obligations were translated into Spanish (tratado de las relaciones obligacionales, 1995). He was one of the advisors of the German Government during the reform of the law of obligations (Schuldrechtsreform) in 2002.

Memberships and honours 
Medicus was elected member of the Bavarian Academy of Sciences and Humanities (Class for History and Philosophy) in 1980. He was awarded a doctorate honoris causa by the University of Regensburg in 1999 and by the University of Halle-Wittenberg in 2008.

Works 
 Bürgerliches Recht. Eine nach Anspruchsgrundlagen geordnete Darstellung zur Examensvorbereitung. Carl Heymanns Verlag, Köln 1968. 29th edition (with Jens Petersen): Verlag Franz Vahlen, München 2014, .
 Gesetzliche Schuldverhältnisse. Delikts- und Schadensrecht, Bereicherung, Geschäftsführung ohne Auftrag. Verlag C. H. Beck, München 1977, . 5th edition: Verlag C. H. Beck, München 2007, .
 Allgemeiner Teil des BGB. Ein Lehrbuch. C.F. Müller Verlag, Heidelberg 1982, . 10th edition: C.F. Müller Verlag, Heidelberg 2010, .
 Grundwissen zum bürgerlichen Recht. Ein Basisbuch zu den Anspruchsgrundlagen. Carl Heymanns Verlag, Köln 1994, . 8th edition: Carl Heymanns Verlag, Köln 2008, .
 Id quod interest – Studien zum römischen Recht des Schadensersatzes. Böhlau Verlag, Köln and Graz 1962.

References

Further reading
 Maximilian Fuchs, Dieter Medicus zum 80. Geburtstag, NJW 2009, 1400
 Volker Beuthien, Dieter Medicus zum 75. Geburtstag, NJW 2004, 1642.

1929 births
2015 deaths
Jurists from Berlin
German legal scholars
Academic staff of the Ludwig Maximilian University of Munich